Brenitsa is a village in Northern Bulgaria. It is in Knezha Municipality, Pleven Province.

Brenitza is in northwestern Bulgaria in the Danubian Plain.

Villages in Pleven Province